The Indian Journal of Critical Care Medicine is a peer-reviewed open-access medical journal published on behalf of the Indian Society of Critical Care Medicine. The journal publishes articles on the subject of critical and intensive care including emergency medicine.

Abstracting and indexing 
The journal is indexed with Abstracts on Hygiene and Communicable Diseases, Bioline International, CAB Abstracts, Caspur, CINAHL, DOAJ, EBSCO, EMCARE, Excerpta Medica/EMBASE, Expanded Academic ASAP, JournalSeek, Global Health, Google Scholar, Health & Wellness Research Center, Health Reference Center Academic, HINARI, Index Copernicus, OpenJGate, PubMed, Scimago Journal Ranking, SCOLOAR, Scopus, SIIC databases, Tropical Diseases Bulletin, and Ulrich's  Periodicals Directory.

External links 
 

Open access journals
Quarterly journals
English-language journals
Publications established in 2003
Emergency medicine journals
Academic journals associated with learned and professional societies of India